Khuda Haafiz is a 2020 Indian Hindi-language direct-to-video action thriller film written and directed by Faruk Kabir and produced by Kumar Mangat Pathak and Abhishek Pathak under Panorama Studios. It stars Vidyut Jammwal and Shivaleeka Oberoi, with Annu Kapoor, Aahana Kumra and Shiv Panditt in supporting roles. Set during the financial crisis of 2007–2008, the film is inspired by true events and follows Sameer Chaudhary, a young man who races against time to rescue his kidnapped wife Nargis from flesh traders. The film premiered on Disney+ Hotstar on 14 August 2020. The film received mixed reviews from critics and positive response from audience, praising the cast's performance, action sequences and technical aspects. It was a success in Disney+ Hotstar.

Plot
In 2007, Sameer Chowdhary is a software engineer and businessman who falls in love with Nargis and the two get married. A financial crisis in 2008 leaves them both jobless. Three months later, they get jobs in a fictional Middle east country named Noman, with the help of Nadeem, an employee at an overseas recruitment company. Nargis leaves first, and Sameer stays to wait for his documents to arrive. After her arrival, Nargis calls Sameer in a panic, crying that someone is kidnapping her. Sameer travels to Noman, where he meets Usman Hamid Ali Murad, a taxi driver. He asks Usman to take him to the address given by Nadeem but learns there's no such address. Usman takes Sameer to the police station, where he learns that Nadeem has gone missing. Fallen out of help with the police due to his restless nature, Sameer approaches the Indian embassy. He poses as an employee of a telecom company and acquires the address of the person from whose phone Nargis contacted him, and it turns out to be a man named Shirazi. Sameer and Usman learn about Shirazi's involvement in the human trafficking. 

Sameer visits brothels with Usman in search of Nargis and finds her in one, but he is attacked by the owners and turns violent, killing men, followed by a car chase that ends with a crash and his arrest by the Indian Embassy cops, as Sameer has finished narrating his story, he is approached by a Nomani cop named Faiz Abu Malik who decides to help him, with officer Tamena joining along. They view the CCTV footage of the Noman airport, where they see Nargis entering a van with a man revealed to be Iztek, an Algerian modelling coordinator. Iztek orders that Nargis be killed. Faiz and Tamena come across a burnt corpse and believe it to be Nargis. Sameer sees her pendant on it and is shattered. Following her funeral, he is given compensation and tickets to India. Tamena learns Nargis is alive, and the corpse they found was of a different woman. She and Faiz try to find Sameer before learning he never boarded the flight. Now wanting revenge, Sameer disguises himself and arrives at Iztek's house. The two violently fight before Iztek reveals Nargis is alive. Faiz and Tamena arrive, and Faiz is revealed to be Iztek's ally. Tamena subdues Faiz long enough to buy Sameer time to escape. 

Faiz kills Tamena and frames Sameer. An ensuing chase leaves Iztek dead. Faiz meets his crime partner, Iztek's boss, which is photographed by an undercover cop. Sameer is captured by Faiz before his betrayal is revealed by the commissioner. Sameer and Faiz engage in a fistfight where Sameer beats Faiz. Nargis and the other women are freed, and Tamena is given a State funeral. Faiz wakes up in a pound in the middle of a desert in front of a firing squad for his crimes. They shoot him to death. Sameer and Nargis prepare to depart the plane for India while making the last meeting with Usman. Sameer invites Usman to come to India and meet with their family, as they greet him before leaving.

Cast 
 Vidyut Jammwal as Sameer Chaudhary, Nargis's husband
 Shivaleeka Oberoi as Nargis Rajput Choudhary, Sameer's wife 
 Annu Kapoor as Usman Hamid Ali Murad, a taxi driver in Noman
 Shiv Panditt as Faiz Abu Malik, Itzak's ally in the ISA
 Aahana Kumra as Tamena Hamid, ISA
 Vipin Sharma as Nadeem, an agent, and employee at Ansaar Overseas Recruitment
 Nawab Shah as Iztak Regini
 Siddhant Ghegadmal as Karim
 Rio Kapadia as Commander Ali Azam Ghazi, Tamena's boss
 Ikhlaque Khan as IK Mishra, Deputy Council of Affairs at the Indian Embassy in Noman
 Arradhya Maan as Employee
 Suparna Marwah as Nagma Rajput, Nargis' mother
 Mohit Chauhan as Harsh Rajput, Nargis' father
 Mömin Rizo as I.K Mishra assistant
 Shahnawaz Pradhan as Suraj Pradhan Chaudhary, Sameer’s father
 Gargi Patel as Nandini Chaudhary, Sameer’s mother
 Nithish as Sahir
 Asrar Khan as Police Officer (LKO)

Production 
Following official announcement in April 2019, shooting commenced at Uzbekistan on 14 October 2019.

Soundtrack 

The music for the film was composed by Mithoon who also wrote lyrics for four of the tracks, with Sayeed Quadri penning two songs in the soundtrack album.

Marketing and release 
On 29 June 2020, Disney+ Hotstar conducted a virtual press conference where Uday Shankar announced the film's digital release on the platform on 14 August 2020, exclusively as part of the Disney+ Hotstar Multiplex initiative which was a result of cinemas being shut down due to COVID-19 pandemic. However, Vidyut Jammwal was not invited for the social media announcement, along with Kunal Khemu, whose film Lootcase also released on the same digital streaming platform. Disney+ Hotstar released and promoted the film's trailer first, through the streaming application on 24 July 2020, along with the much anticipated premiere of Sushant Singh Rajput's last film Dil Bechara. The trailer was launched through YouTube, the following day.

Critical reception
Saibal Chatterjee of NDTV gave the film 3/5, mentioning, "The spirit of this film, for whatever it is worth, is best exemplified by the hero wishing a friend Khuda Haafiz with his hands folded to denote a namaste. That alone would have set Khuda Haafiz apart if only it had been a better film."

Sequel 
 A sequel titled Khuda Haafiz Chapter II Agni Pariksha was announced in September 2020 after the success of the first part with Kumar Mangat and Abhishek Pathak as the producers and Faruk Kabir as the director. Vidyut Jammwal and Shivaleeka Oberoi will reprise their roles, and the sequel will go on floors in March 2021 before releasing in October 2021 in cinemas.

Notes

References

External links
 
Khuda Haafiz on Bollywood Hungama

2020s Hindi-language films
2020 action thriller films
Indian action thriller films
2020 films
Indian films based on actual events
Action films based on actual events
Thriller films based on actual events
Films about kidnapping
Films not released in theaters due to the COVID-19 pandemic
2020 direct-to-video films
Disney+ Hotstar original films
Films shot in Uzbekistan
Films set in a fictional country
Films set in the Middle East